Willem Davnis Louis Didier Geubbels (born 16 August 2001) is a French professional footballer who plays as forward for Swiss club St. Gallen.

Club career

Lyon
Geubbels started his playing career at Lyon's academy. He made his first team debut on 23 September 2017 in a 3–3 home draw against Dijon in Ligue 1. He entered the field after 84 minutes, replacing Lucas Tousart. In doing so, Geubbels became the first player born in the 21st century to appear in Ligue 1, as well as the 5th youngest player ever to make a Ligue 1 debut at 16 years, one month and seven days old. On 7 December, Geubbels came on for an injured Maxwel Cornet in the 45+1' minute of a 1–0 away loss to Atalanta in the Europa League. In doing so, Geubbels once again became the first player born in the 21st century to appear in the UEFA Europa League as well as the youngest player ever to make a Europa League debut at 16 years and 113 days old.

Monaco
On 19 June 2018, Geubbels signed with Monaco for €20 million.

Loan to Nantes
On 31 August 2021, he joined Nantes on loan for the 2021–22 season with an option to buy. He scored his first goal for the club on 2 January 2022 in the Coupe de France against Vitré. He scored again three weeks later in a 4–2 league victory over Lorient. He returned to Monaco after a season marked by ups and downs, as Nantes managed to win the Coupe de France.

St. Gallen
On 23 January 2023, Geubbels signed a 2.5-year contract with St. Gallen in Switzerland.

Personal life
Geubbels was born in France to a Dutch father, and a mother of Central African Republic descent. His uncles, Amos Youga and Kelly Youga, are both footballers who represented the Central African Republic national team.

Career statistics

Honours
Nantes
 Coupe de France: 2021–22

References

External links

Monaco profile

2001 births
French sportspeople of Central African Republic descent
People from Villeurbanne
Sportspeople from Lyon Metropolis
Footballers from Auvergne-Rhône-Alpes
Living people
French footballers
France youth international footballers
Association football forwards
Olympique Lyonnais players
AS Monaco FC players
FC Nantes players
FC St. Gallen players
Ligue 1 players
French people of Dutch descent
French expatriate footballers
Expatriate footballers in Monaco
French expatriate sportspeople in Monaco
Expatriate footballers in Switzerland
French expatriate sportspeople in Switzerland